Klaus Hulek (born 19 August 1952 in Hindelang) is a German mathematician, known for his work in algebraic geometry and in particular, his work on moduli spaces.

Life 

Klaus Hulek studied Mathematics from 1971 at Ludwig Maximilian University of Munich graduating in 1976 with his Diplom. In 1974/75 he studied at Brasenose College of the University of Oxford, where he obtained a master's degree.

He obtained his doctorate under the supervision of Wolf Barth at the University of Erlangen–Nuremberg in 1979. In 1982/83 he held a Post-doctorate at Brown University and after that he returned to Erlangen as a research scientist, where he completed his habilitation in 1984, gaining the title Privatdozent.

From 1985, Hulek was a professor at the University of Bayreuth, and in 1990 he moved to Leibniz University Hannover, where he was also vice-president for research from 2005 to January 2015.

Hulek is an editor of the journal Mathematische Nachrichten. Since 2016 he has been editor in chief of zbMATH (formerly Zentralblatt für Mathematik). Hulek was vice president of the German Mathematical Society (DMV) from January 2019 to May 2020.

His former doctoral students include Andreas Gathmann and Matthias Schütt.

List of works 
 Elementare algebraische Geometrie, Vieweg 2000, 2. Auflage 2012
 English translation Elementary algebraic geometry, American Mathematical Society 2003
 Projective Geometry of Elliptic Curves, Asterisque, Band 137, 1986
 with Constantin Kahn, Steven Weintraub Moduli spaces of Abelian surfaces: compactification, degenerations, and theta functions, de Gruyter 1993
 with Wolf Barth, Chris Peters, Antonius van de Ven Compact complex surfaces, Springer Verlag, 2. Auflage 2004 (Ergebnisse der Mathematik und ihrer Grenzgebiete)
 Edited with Fabrizio Catanese, Chris Peters, Miles Reid New trends in algebraic geometry, Cambridge University Press, London Mathematical Society Lecturenotes Series 264, 1999 (Conference Warwick 1996)
 Edited with Fabrizio Catanese, Hélène Esnault, Alan Huckleberry, Thomas Peternell Global Aspects of Complex Geometry, Springer Verlag 2006
 Edited with Wolf Barth, Herbert Lange Abelian Varieties, de Gruyter 1995 (Proc. Egloffstein Conference)
 Edited with Wolfgang Ebeling, Knut Smoczyk Complex and Differential Geometry, Springer Verlag 2011 (Conference Hannover 2009)
 Edited with Thomas Peternell, Michael Schneider, Frank-Olaf Schreyer Complex algebraic varieties, Lecture Notes in Mathematics 1507, Springer Verlag 1992 (Congference Bayreuth 1990)
 Elliptic curves, abelian surfaces and the icosahedron (German), Jahresbericht des DMV, Band 91, 1989, S. 126-147
 Geometry of the Horrocks-Mumford bundle, Proc. Symp. Pure Math., 46, Teil 2, 1987, S. 69-85
 Riemann Surfaces, in Francoise, Naber, Tsun (Eds.) Encyclopedia of Mathematical Physics, Elsevier 2006
 The Kodaira dimension of the moduli of K3 surfaces, Invent. Math. 169 (2007), 519-567 (with V. Gritsenko, G. K. Sankaran)
 The class of the locus of intermediate Jacobians of cubic threefolds, Invent. Math. 190 (2012), No. 1, 119-168 (with S. Grushevsky)

External links 

Homepage
 Videos from Klaus Hulek (in German) in the AV-Portal of the German National Library of Science and Technology

References

20th-century German mathematicians
1952 births
Living people
21st-century German mathematicians
Algebraic geometers
Ludwig Maximilian University of Munich alumni
University of Erlangen-Nuremberg alumni
Academic staff of the University of Bayreuth
Academic staff of the University of Hanover
People from Oberallgäu